Veins of the World is a 2020 Mongolian drama thriller film written by Byambasuren Davaa
with Jiska Rickels and directed by Byambasuren Davaa. It was selected as the Mongolian entry for the Best International Feature Film at the 93rd Academy Awards, but it was not nominated.

Cast
 Bat-Ireedui Batmunkh as Amra
 Enerel Tumen as Zaya
 Yalalt Namsrai as Erdene
 Algirchamin Baatarsuren as Altaa
 Ariunbyamba Sukhee as Huyagaa
 Manduul Baasansuren as Host Mongolia's Got Talent Studio
 Sukhbaatar Battuvshin as Ninja #3
 Purevragchaa Batzorig as Old Monk

Release
The film had its world premiere at the 70th Berlin International Film Festival on February 23, 2020.

See also
 List of submissions to the 93rd Academy Awards for Best International Feature Film
 List of Mongolian submissions for the Academy Award for Best International Feature Film

References

External links
 

2020 films
2020 thriller drama films
Mongolian-language films
Mongolian drama films